Trooper Campbell is a 1914 film from director Raymond Longford based on a poem by Henry Lawson.

It was considered a lost film but was discovered in the 1980s. Film writers Graham Shirley and Brian Adams stated that the film:
Shows an advance on The Romantic Story of Margaret Catchpole, not so much in performance, which is still haunted by melodrama, as in the use of depth of field and positioning within the frame... [It] appears to have been hurriedly made (it was never listed among Longford's major achievements) and displays nowhere near the polish of Alfred Rolfe's The Hero of the Dardanelles, completed halfway through the next year.

References

External links

Full text of poem
Trooper Campbell at National Film and Sound Archive

Australian silent short films
1914 films
1910s rediscovered films
Films directed by Raymond Longford
Australian black-and-white films
Rediscovered Australian films